The Klein Wellhorn (also spelled Kleines Wellhorn) is a mountain in the Bernese Alps, overlooking Rosenlaui in the Bernese Oberland. It lies north of the Wellhorn.

References

External links
 Klein Wellhorn on Hikr

Bernese Alps
Mountains of the Alps
Mountains of Switzerland
Mountains of the canton of Bern
Two-thousanders of Switzerland